Carabus sylvestris transsylvanicus is a subspecies of green-coloured beetle in the family Carabidae that can be found in Hungary, Liechtenstein, Poland, Romania, and Slovakia.

References

sylvestris transsylvanicus
Beetles described in 1826